Shenango Township is a township in Lawrence County, Pennsylvania, United States. The population was 7,133 at the 2020 census, a decline from the figure of 7,479 tabulated in 2010. Shenango Township is situated between the city of New Castle to the north and the borough of Ellwood City to the south.

Geography
According to the United States Census Bureau, the township has a total area of 24.4 square miles (63.3 km2), of which 24.4 square miles (63.2 km2) is land and 0.04% is water. Unincorporated communities in the township include Weigletown, Altman, East New Castle, Union Valley, Castlewood, Duckrun, and part of Energy.

Adjacent townships and boroughs
Taylor Township (west)
Hickory Township (north)
New Castle (north)
South New Castle (northwest)
Slippery Rock Township (east)
Wayne Township (south)

History 
Named for the Shenango River, Shenango Township was incorporated in 1796 as a part of Beaver County, Pennsylvania; Lawrence County did not yet exist. Shenango later became one of Lawrence County's original townships and quickly became one of the most populous areas, because the land was suitable for many different purposes. One of the first settlers to live in Shenango was William Carins. He came to this area in 1796 and was the man who gave Shenango its name. Carins worked as a cloth weaver and ran a small store where he sold his goods. William Tindall was another one of Shenango's first settlers. Tindall was paid  for his service in the Revolutionary War. He lived to the age of 93 and was buried in the Tindall family cemetery near the "Turkey Hill" section of the township. The Tindall family cemetery is most famously known as the resting place of Mary Black, a supposed, but never proven, witch of around the same time period. Her grave is separate from the others and is the only one dug up. Shenango's largest land owner was a Philadelphia lawyer named Benjamin Chew. Chew bought up large portions of the southern extent of the township under assumed names for pennies an acre. He later resold the land for a profit, and the small town of Chewton was later named after him.

The township was linked to New Castle, Ellwood and Pittsburgh in 1908 by the Pittsburgh, Harmony, Butler and New Castle Railway, an interurban trolley line. The line closed on 15 June 1931, and the trolleys were replaced by buses.

The New Castle Armory was listed on the National Register of Historic Places in 1991.

Demographics
As of the census of 2000, there were 7,633 people, 2,854 households, and 2,171 families residing in the township.  The population density was 312.6 people per square mile (120.7/km2).  There were 2,996 housing units at an average density of 122.7/sq mi (47.4/km2).  The racial makeup of the township was 97.29% White, 1.72% African American, 0.04% Native American, 0.10% Asian, 0.01% Pacific Islander, 0.41% from other races, and 0.43% from two or more races. Hispanic or Latino of any race were 0.76% of the population.

There were 2,854 households, out of which 31.1% had children under the age of 18 living with them, 63.2% were married couples living together, 9.2% had a female householder with no husband present, and 23.9% were non-families. 21.7% of all households were made up of individuals, and 12.6% had someone living alone who was 65 years of age or older.  The average household size was 2.56 and the average family size was 2.99.

In the township the population was spread out, with 24.1% under the age of 18, 7.1% from 18 to 24, 25.8% from 25 to 44, 24.3% from 45 to 64, and 18.7% who were 65 years of age or older.  The median age was 41 years. For every 100 females there were 102.8 males.  For every 100 females age 18 and over, there were 95.1 males.

The median income for a household in the township was $39,949, and the median income for a family was $46,933. Males had a median income of $36,387 versus $21,783 for females. The per capita income for the township was $19,068.  About 4.3% of families and 5.2% of the population were below the poverty line, including 7.2% of those under age 18 and 3.2% of those age 65 or over.

Population

Education
Children residing in the township attend the Shenango Area School District. It was selected by Business Week as one of the top five schools in the state in 2009. Shenango Area schools also serves the adjacent municipality of South New Castle, Pennsylvania residents as well.

A significant percentage of graduates attend college, with Slippery Rock University of Pennsylvania, Penn State University, Youngstown State University, and Butler County Community College being popular choices.

Public transportation
Shenango Township's public transportation is served by the New Castle Area Transit Authority. They make many stops in Shenango and go as far away as Pittsburgh. In 2013 the Transit Authority opened a brand new Park & Ride or route 422 for commuters who used one of the bus routes to Pittsburgh.

Residential
Shenango Township is made up of several smaller residential neighborhoods which were built by local developers over the last 50 years.  These neighborhoods are connected by the current state local road system in the township.  Shenango saw its first residential developments in the late 1950s and 1960s with the construction of most of the homes that can be found today in Ridgewood Court and Willowhurst Circle.  These two developments were built at the same time that a new high school was being constructed to serve the community.  The 1970s and 1980s saw limited residential development throughout the township, possibly due to the struggling local economy at the time. The 1990s through the present have shown a great turnaround for the township, with the construction of several residential developments.  Single family developments such as  Woodland Hills, Deer Run, Orchardale Estates Phase I, Jason's Woods Phase I & II, and Cambridge at Hidden Lakes Phase I have led to a significant population growth in Shenango Township over the last 25 years.  The construction of townhomes and condos in The Fields and Shenango Greens has added to the diversity of residences in Shenango Township.

Government and infrastructure
The New Castle Youth Development Center (NCYDC), a juvenile detention center of the Pennsylvania Department of Human Services, was located in the township. The facility, which opened in 1969, had  of space in 13 buildings, and almost  of land. It closed in February 2013. This location came under scrutiny when the property was hastily processed for sale to non-profit organization from New Jersey in the summer of 2017. In the Spring of 2018 the property was transferred to a local social services company, and is proposed to become their new community outreach and commercial center.

Business
Shenango Township is served by three separate commercial centers: the U.S. Route 422 corridor, the Pennsylvania Route 65 Corridor, and the Shenango Industrial Park. The Route 65 Corridor is home to much of the township's shopping district. This area is served by the Lawrence Village Plaza, which is home to T & M Hardware Store and an adjacent Busy Beaver Home Improvement store.  This area is also served by many national chain fast food restaurants.  The Route 422 corridor is more of a light industrial-focused area which is anchored by the McKesson Corporation, Con Yeager Spice Company, Portersville Valve, and a recently renovated Quality Inn. This area is also home to the township's lone remaining grocery store, Giant Eagle.

Parks and recreation
Shenango Towhship's main recreation center is the Shenango Township Community Park, which includes a children's playground area, four covered pavilions, restroom facilities, a quarter-mile walking trail, pickleball, and bocce courts. Shenango Township also owns another recreation area on the corner of Shenango Park Drive and Nearwood Drive.

Shenango Township is home to a portion of the North Country Trail, this trail runs through the southern section of the county, with on road, and off-road portions, in 2018 Shenango Township was a recipient of $980,000.00 grant to begin improvements to a portion of the on road trail segment.

Although owned by the city of New Castle, Sylvan Heights public golf course is located within Shenango Township. The 18 hole course lies between PA 65 and Old Princeton Roads.

Board of Supervisors
Frank R. Augustine, Chairman
Brandon M. Rishel, Vice-Chairman
Albert D. Burick III, Secretary-Treasurer

References

External links

 Shenango Fire/Rescue, volunteer fire department
 Shenango Area School District

Populated places established in 1796
Townships in Lawrence County, Pennsylvania
1796 establishments in Pennsylvania